The Cathedral of the Holy Name or Holy Name Cathedral is a Roman Catholic cathedral in the Indian city of Mumbai (Bombay), that has the seat and 
is the headquarters of the Archbishop of Bombay. The cathedral is located in the Colaba area of South Bombay, built in the Gothic Revival style that was favoured by British architects.

The cathedral is contained with the premises of the Holy Name High School founded in 1939.

References

External links

 Parish of the Holy Name
 Archdiocese of Bombay

Churches in Mumbai
Gothic Revival church buildings in India
Holy Name, Mumbai
Roman Catholic churches in Maharashtra
Roman Catholic churches in Mumbai